Jackson Township is a township in Little River County, Arkansas, United States. Its total population was 1,692 as of the 2010 United States Census, a decrease of 8.54 percent from 1,850 at the 2000 census.

According to the 2010 Census, Jackson Township is located at  (33.717820, -94.418128).

The city of Foreman is located within the township.

References

External links 

Townships in Arkansas
Little River County, Arkansas